Ocellularia albobullata is a species of corticolous (bark-dwelling) lichen in the family Graphidaceae. Found in Costa Rica, it was described as new to science in 2011 by lichenologists Robert Lücking, Harrie Sipman, and Martin Grube. The type specimen was collected by Grube in Corcovado National Park at sea level. The lichen is known to occur in several locations in the coastal rainforest of southern Costa Rica. Ocellularia albobullata contains several secondary chemicals, including psoromic acid, subpsoromic acid, and 2'-O-demethylpsoromic acid.

See also
 List of Ocellularia species

References

albobullata
Lichen species
Lichens described in 2011
Lichens of Central America
Taxa named by Robert Lücking
Taxa named by Harrie Sipman